Rasul Maksatowiç Çaryýew (born on 30 September 1999) is a Turkmen footballer who plays as a goalkeeper for Turkmen club Ahal and the Turkmenistan national team.

International career
Çaryýew debuted internationally on 5 June 2021, against South Korea in a 5–0 defeat.

References

1999 births
Living people
Sportspeople from Ashgabat
Turkmenistan footballers
Association football goalkeepers
FK Köpetdag Aşgabat players
Turkmenistan international footballers